Erica Tazel (born 1977) is an American theatre and television actress best known for the role of US Deputy Marshall Rachel Brooks in the FX television series Justified (2010–2015).

Life and career
Tazel holds a B.A. from Spelman College and an M.F.A. from New York University's Graduate Acting Program.

She made her professional acting debut at the New York Shakespeare Festival’s The Winter’s Tale (2000); further roles include at the Royal Shakespeare Company's Cymbeline, and an off-Broadway appearance in Playwrights Horizons' Juvenilia. Tazel was nominated for the L.A. Drama Critics Circle award for Lead Performance, for her work in I Have Before Me a Remarkable Document Given To Me by a Young Lady from Rwanda (role of Juliette, 2007) at The Colony Theatre in Burbank, CA, and received the NAACP Theatre Award for Best Lead Female (2007) for that same role.

On screen, Tazel has made limited appearances, including a minor role in the David Duchovny drama House of D (2004, table below), starring Anton Yelchin, Robin Williams, Téa Leoni, and Erykah Badu.

Tazel's television debut was as a dance teacher in an episode of Sex and the City (2001); prior to her supporting role in Justified she was a guest lead on Without A Trace, had recurring roles on Jericho and Third Watch, and guest roles on programs including The Office, ER, Law & Order and Law & Order: Special Victims Unit, Life, Heartland, Bones, and Firefly.

Filmography

Film and TV Movies

Television

Video games

References

External links

African-American actresses
Actresses from Dallas
Spelman College alumni
Tisch School of the Arts alumni
American stage actresses
American Shakespearean actresses
1977 births
Living people